West Caribbean Airways S.A. (abbreviated as WCA) was a commercial airline founded in December 1998 with its headquarters at Olaya Herrera Airport in Medellín, Colombia after moving there from San Andres Island in 2001. It began operating in November 1999 and ceased operations in September 2005.

History
The company was founded on December 29, 1998, by Colombian businessman Hassan Tannir and began operations on November 13, 1999. Originally based in San Andrés, it began operations as a charter with four Let L-410 Turbolets that served San Andrés and Providencia Island as the first destinations.

In 2000, West Caribbean Airways added flights to Cartagena, Monteria, and Barranquilla with leased ATR 42s and also expanded to international routes to Varadero, Cuba; Panama City, Panama; and San Jose, Costa Rica. The next year, a group of investors acquired the airline and relocated its headquarters to Medellin. This put it in competition with ACES and Avianca.

The airline expanded very rapidly, and acquired three McDonnell Douglas MD-80s which operated various international and regional routes.

By 2005, serious financial and procedural problems were evident at West Caribbean Airways. It posted $6 million in losses in 2004. In January, the airline was fined $45,000 by Colombia's civil aeronautics government agency, UAEAC, for 14 safety violations, including lack of training for pilots, pilots flying too many flight hours, and flight data not being properly logged.

A few months later, in March 2005, Flight 9955 brought further scrutiny by UAEAC. Due to its 2004 losses, the civil aviation authority began close monitoring of West Caribbean Airways's finances in May, though it was stated that the airline was fulfilling its commitments.

On August 16, 2005, Flight 708 crashed in Venezuela. By the time of this accident, WCA had only four aircraft left in its fleet: a Let L-410, two undergoing maintenance, and the aircraft destroyed in Flight 708. West Caribbean Airways was grounded by UAEAC late in the day on August 17.

The end of operations occurred in September 2005, when the airline could no longer sustain operations. A month later, crew members indicated to passengers that the airline would remain on the ground due to the poor economic conditions and that it did not have the ability to meet its financial obligations.

Destinations
West Caribbean Airways operated the following services (at January 2005):

Oranjestad (Queen Beatrix International Airport)

Apartadó (Antonio Roldán Betancourt Airport)
Armenia (El Edén International Airport)
Barranquilla (Ernesto Cortissoz International Airport)
Bogotá (El Dorado International Airport) Hub
Cali (Alfonso Bonilla Aragón International Airport)
Cartagena (Rafael Núñez International Airport)
Caucasia (Juan H. White Airport)
Chigorodó (Jaime Ortiz Betancur Airport)
Cúcuta (Camilo Daza International Airport)
El Bagre (El Bagre Airport)
Manizales (La Nubia Airport)
Medellín (José María Córdova International Airport) Hub
Medellín (Olaya Herrera Airport)
Montería (Los Garzones Airport)
Otú (Otú Airport)
Providencia (El Embrujo Airport)
Puerto Berrío (Morela Airport)
Quibdó (El Caraño Airport)
San Andrés (Gustavo Rojas Pinilla International Airport)
Tolú (Golfo de Morrosquillo Airport)
Turbo (Gonzalo Mejía Airport)
Urrao (Urrao Airport)

San José (Juan Santamaría International Airport)

Varadero (Juan Gualberto Gómez Airport)

Panama City (Tocumen International Airport)

Fleet

The West Caribbean Airways fleet consisted of the following aircraft:

Accidents and incidents
On March 26, 2005, West Caribbean Airways Flight 9955, a Let L-410 Turbolet (registered HK-4146), on departure from El Embrujo, Isla de Providencia failed to climb and hit hills close to the runway, killing the two crew and six of the twelve passengers. Initial reports suggested a technical fault.
On August 16, 2005, West Caribbean Airways Flight 708, a chartered McDonnell Douglas MD-82 (registered HK-4374X) heading from Panama to Martinique in the Caribbean, crashed in remote western Venezuela due to human errors, killing all 160 aboard, mostly French nationals.

See also
List of defunct airlines of Colombia

References

External links

West Caribbean Airways (Archive) 
West Caribbean Airways Fleet

Defunct airlines of Colombia
Airlines established in 1998
Airlines disestablished in 2005